Rogers is a city in Benton County, Arkansas, United States. Located in the Ozarks, it is part of the Northwest Arkansas region, one of the fastest growing metro areas in the country. Rogers was the location of the first Walmart store, whose corporate headquarters is located in neighboring Bentonville. Daisy Outdoor Products, known for its air rifles, has both its headquarters and its Airgun Museum in Rogers.

As of the 2010 census, the city had a population of 55,964. In 2019, the estimated population was 68,669, making it the sixth-most populous city in the state. Northwest Arkansas is ranked 109th in terms of population in the United States, with 465,776 inhabitants as of the 2010 U.S. Census.

History

Rogers was named after Captain Charles W. Rogers, who was vice-president and general manager of the St. Louis and San Francisco Railway, also known as the Frisco. The town was established in 1881, the year the Frisco line arrived; it was at this time the area residents honored Captain Rogers by naming it for him. The community was incorporated on June 6, 1881.

Historic commerce
The first retail business owned by the Stroud family was a store in Pea Ridge, Arkansas, which was co-owned by Allen Bryant Stroud (1831–1914) and his son Harlan Lafayette (H.L.) Stroud (1858–1950). That business was established prior to 1879 and Allen Stroud also served as postmaster at Pea Ridge for a time. In 1884, H.L. Stroud sold his interest in the Stroud store in Pea Ridge and purchased a dry goods store at the corner of First and Walnut Streets in Rogers which he named Stroud's Mercantile.

In 1887 he brought in his brother Evan Giesen (1868–1952) to serve as manager of his new business. In 1891 H.L. Stroud moved his business into a storefront on the north side of the 100 block of Walnut Street. Stroud's continued to prosper, and in 1899 H.L. built the brick building at 114–116 West Walnut Street. Stroud's continued to be the leading retail business in Rogers up into the 1960s, when in 1962 Sam Walton opened the first location of what would become the retail giant Walmart just seven blocks away. Walton's new store combined with the nationwide movement of retail centers from aged downtowns to malls and shopping centers slowly eroded Stroud's customer base, leading the locally beloved retailer to permanently close in 1993 after 109 years in business.  In 1912 the city council formed a commission of local businessmen to facilitate the paving of downtown Rogers.  Despite the constant complaints of dusty and muddy streets, and the enthusiastic support of prominent citizens such as Coin Harvey, bickering over the cost and method of paving delayed the start of the project until July 1924.  The downtown area was paved with concrete and overlaid with bricks in rows, changing to a basket weave pattern at the intersections of streets.  The work was completed in December 1924, and the brick pavement remains today, with renovations done to the streets in 2010.

Geography
Rogers is located at  (36.329388, −94.141372).

Climate
The climate in this area is characterized by warm, humid summers and generally mild to cool winters.  According to the Köppen Climate Classification system, Rogers has a humid subtropical climate, abbreviated "Cfa" on climate maps.

Demographics

2020 census

As of the 2020 United States census, there were 69,908 people, 24,297 households, and 16,517 families residing in the city.

2010 census
 Rogers had a population of 55,964.  The racial and ethnic composition of the population was 62.0% non-Hispanic white, 1.3% non-Hispanic black, 1.0% Native American, 2.5% Asian, 0.3% Pacific Islander, 0.1% non-Hispanics of some other race, 3.0% from two or more races and 31.5% Hispanic or Latino.

2000 census
As of the census of 2000, there were 38,829 people, 14,005 households, and 10,209 families residing in the city. The racial makeup of the city was 90.75% White, 0.47% Black or African American, 1.05% Native American, 1.43% Asian, 0.07% Pacific Islander, 9.43% from other races, and 1.80% from two or more races. 19.29% of the population are Hispanic or Latino of any race.

There were 14,005 households, out of which 39.4% had children under the age of 18 living with them, 58.4% were married couples living together, 10.1% had a female householder with no husband present, and 27.1% were non-families. 22.2% of all households were made up of individuals, and 8.9% had someone living alone who was 65 years of age or older.  The average household size was 2.74 and the average family size was 3.21.

In the city, the population was spread out, with 29.4% under the age of 18, 9.0% from 18 to 24, 31.5% from 25 to 44, 18.3% from 45 to 64, and 11.8% who were 65 years of age or older. The median age was 32 years. For every 100 females, there were 95.3 males.  For every 100 females age 18 and over, there were 91.5 males.

The median income for a household in the city was $40,474, and the median income for a family was $45,876. Males had a median income of $30,911 versus $22,020 for females. The per capita income for the city was $19,761.  About 9.4% of families and 12.8% of the population were below the poverty line, including 17.6% of those under age 18 and 10.1% of those age 65 or over.

Human resources

Education

Primary and secondary education
Rogers is home to several public and private school districts and schools including:
 Rogers School District, which serves the majority of the municipality - In 2012, 2013, & 2014, both Rogers and Rogers Heritage high schools were recognized with Silver awards from U.S. News & World Report Top 1,000 High Schools in America and were ranked among the top schools in the state. Additionally, for many years, Rogers High School has been ranked by Newsweek magazine among the top 1,300 schools in the country.
Rogers High School (RHS), slogan "Home of the Mountaineers", is Rogers' first high school, established in 1922. RHS, with about 2,000 students, is in the state's largest classification (7A).
 Rogers Heritage High School (RHHS), slogan "Home of the War Eagles", is Rogers' second high school, opening in August 2008.  RHHS, with about 2,000 students, is in the state's largest classification (7A). Both RHS and RHHS offer the same courses and athletic opportunities.
 Rogers New Technology High School (RNTHS) opened in 2013 and is part of the New Tech Network. Like more than 120 New Tech schools around the country, the Rogers school features an instructional approach centered on project-based learning and integrated technology in the classroom.
 Portions of Rogers to the west are within the boundary of Bentonville Public Schools
 Arkansas Arts Academy High School is a public charter school supported by the Arkansas Arts Academy district.
 St. Vincent de Paul is a private Catholic school of the Roman Catholic Diocese of Little Rock, the largest private school in Rogers. The nearest Catholic high school is Ozark Catholic Academy in Tontitown.

Higher education
Postsecondary education within the cities' boundaries include the campuses of the University of Phoenix, Bryan College, Harding University, and John Brown University.

Other nearby schools and campuses include the University of Arkansas (Fayetteville), Northwest Arkansas Community College (Bentonville), and John Brown University (a Christian school in Siloam Springs).

Public safety

The Rogers Police Department is the primary law enforcement agency in the city. The Rogers Fire Department is a career fire service; the Community Risk Reduction Division within RFD reviews development plans, conducts investigations, and provides fire safety education.

Culture and contemporary life

In addition to the Rogers Commercial Historic District, Rogers has numerous properties listed on the National Register of Historic Places, with the oldest being the Pea Ridge National Military Park. Rogers has two shopping malls: the Frisco Station Mall and the Pinnacle Hills Promenade.

Annual cultural events
Since 2007, Rogers has hosted the Walmart NW Arkansas Championship, a women's professional golf tournament on the LPGA Tour. The 54-hole event is held annually at the Pinnacle Country Club in late June. 

Rogers is also host to a Susan G. Komen Race for the Cure, the most widely known, largest and best-funded breast cancer organization in the United States.

Parks and recreation

The NWA Razorback Regional Greenway is a  primarily off-road shared-use trail that connects the region's trail systems to various community attractions. Foerster Park is home to the largest soccer program in the state.

Other recreational attractions in the surrounding area include Beaver Lake, Hobbs State Park – Conservation Area and War Eagle Mill & Cavern to the east of Rogers, as well as historical Civil War battlefield, Pea Ridge National Military Park, about 10 miles outside of Rogers.

Media

Rogers is served by the television market of Fort Smith and Fayetteville, Arkansas. The four major television stations are KFSM (CBS), KFTA (Fox), KHOG (ABC), and KNWA (NBC).

Radio stations in the city include:
 KAMO 94.3 FM
 KDUA 96.5 FM
 KHEL 97.3 FM
 KURM 790 AM & FM 100.3
 KXNA 104.9 FM
 KFFK 1390 AM

The daily newspaper in Rogers is the Rogers Morning News, with a special "A section" dedicated to news just for Rogers and surrounding cities. The rest of the newspaper is the Northwest Arkansas Democrat-Gazette, the Northwest Arkansas edition of the Arkansas Democrat-Gazette (the "B section" is the regular Democrat-Gazette "A section," complete with front page and masthead).

Government

Rogers operates within the mayor-city council form of government. The mayor is elected by a citywide election to serve as the Chief Executive Officer (CEO) of the city by presiding over all city functions, policies, and ordinances. Once elected, the mayor also allocates duties to city employees. The Rogers mayoral election takes place during the United States presidential election. Mayors serve four-year terms and can serve unlimited terms. The city council is the unicameral legislative of the City, consisting of eight city council members. Also included in the council's duties is balancing the city's budget and passing ordinances. Two city council members are elected from each of the city's four wards. Since 2011, the mayor of Rogers has been Republican Greg Hines.

Law enforcement
The Rogers Police Department was established in 1881. , it employs 120 sworn officers and 41 civilian employees.

Politics
The previous mayor, Republican Steve Womack, won election to the United States House of Representatives in 2010 for the seat vacated by Republican John Boozman, now a U.S. senator.

Infrastructure

Aviation
Rogers Municipal Airport (ROG), also known as Carter Field, is home to Walmart's air fleet. All commercial aviation, however, goes through the Northwest Arkansas National Airport (XNA), located about 15 miles west of Rogers in Highfill.

Highways
  Interstate 49
  U.S. Route 62
  U.S. Route 71 Business
  U.S. Route 71
  Arkansas Highway 12
  Arkansas Highway 94

Utilities

The City of Rogers' public water distribution and sanitary sewer collection systems are owned and operated by Rogers Water Utilities (RWU), which is overseen by the Rogers Water Utilities Commission. RWU purchases treated potable water from Beaver Water District, whose source is Beaver Lake. RWU served a retail population of 70878 as of 2019, making it one of the largest water utilities in the state. Wastewater is collected and treated at the Rogers Pollution Control Facility on the west side of the city.

Notable people

 Cecile Bledsoe (born 1944), Arkansas state senator from Rogers
 Jim R. Caldwell (born 1936), the first Republican member of the Arkansas State Senate in the 20th century
 Matt Cornett (born 1998), actor born in Rogers
 Ryan Hale (born 1975), American football player
 Thomas P. Morgan (1864-1928), humorist
 James C. Nance, Oklahoma community newspaper publisher and Speaker of the Oklahoma House of Representatives
 Joe Nichols (born 1976), country music artist born in Rogers
 Vernon Oxford (born 1941), country singer born in Rogers
 Titanic Thompson (1892–1974), gambler and golfer, grew up in Rogers.
 Sam Walton (1918–1992), founder of Wal-Mart, established the first Wal-Mart in Rogers in 1962.
 Steve Womack, mayor of Rogers and U.S. Representative for Arkansas's 3rd congressional district

See also
 Arkansas Highway 102 (1985–2007), former state highway in Rogers
 Lake Atalanta
 Walmart Arkansas Music Pavilion

References

External links

 
 City of Rogers official website
 Rogers-Lowell Area Chamber of Commerce
 Rogers Convention & Visitors Bureau
 Encyclopedia of Arkansas: History & Culture entry: Rogers (Benton County)
 City-Data.com Comprehensive Statistical Data and more about Rogers

 
Cities in Benton County, Arkansas
Cities in Arkansas
Northwest Arkansas
Populated places established in 1881
1881 establishments in Arkansas
Sundown towns in Arkansas